Marjorie Arizona Hill (May 1886 – December 17, 1910) was one of the original nine founders of Alpha Kappa Alpha Sorority, Incorporated's twenty founders at Howard University. Alpha Kappa Alpha was the first sorority to be founded by African-American women. She was characterized as a "small, sweet girl" who fulfilled her tasks.

Early life
Born in Arizona to George and Florence Hill, Marjorie Arizona Hill lived in Washington, D.C. in her early life. She attended M Street High School (later called Dunbar High School), one of the city's academic high schools. She graduated in 1904 alongside Margaret Flagg Holmes, one of the original nine founders of Alpha Kappa Alpha.

Education and career 
Hill attended Howard University and pursued a Bachelor of Arts degree in education and political science. She received an invitation to join Alpha Kappa Alpha in her senior year. She graduated in 1908.

Hill taught at Morgan College in Lynchburg, Virginia. She died on December 17, 1910. Hill was buried at the Woodlawn Cemetery in Washington D.C.

References

External links
Honoring the Past: Alpha Kappa Alpha Founders
Centennial Celebration: Founders

1886 births
1909 deaths
20th-century African-American educators
20th-century American women educators
20th-century American educators
Alpha Kappa Alpha founders
Howard University alumni
Schoolteachers from Virginia